Rochelle Sceats-Basil (born 1 August 1990) is a New Zealand long-distance runner. In 2019, she competed in the senior women's race at the 2019 IAAF World Cross Country Championships held in Aarhus, Denmark. She finished in 98th place.

In 2018, she won the women's race at the Rock 'n' Roll USA Marathon held in Washington, D.C., United States.

References

External links 
 

Living people
1990 births
Place of birth missing (living people)
New Zealand female long-distance runners
New Zealand female cross country runners
New Zealand female marathon runners